A cattery means any building, collection of buildings or property in which cats are housed, maintained cared for and in some cases bred. A cattery can be anything from a state-of-the-art facility with CCTV, televisions and water features to a building attached to a family dwelling, in less reputable establishments they can also be a shed or garage or a collection of free-standing structures made of wood and wire mesh, with some form of roofing, often corrugated iron, similar to an aviary.

Boarding Cattery
This is a place where cats are housed temporarily for a fee.  Although many people worry about the stress placed on the animal by being put in an unfamiliar environment, most boarding catteries work to reduce stress.
Boarding catteries typically have familiar objects, cat trees, climbing frames, scratching posts, and places for the cats to sleep during the day, and blankets and toys from home, are also permitted at many catteries. Some catteries offer onsite grooming and nail trimming.

Communal Cattery
This is often just a room or series of rooms where the cats all mingle together, they are fed together and sleep in whatever space they can find. These catteries have the highest number of fights and illness spreads easily if unchecked, and can be overcrowded, especially at peak times.  There is no way to check if the cats are eating correctly, or to monitor toileting and eating and drinking together can lead to outbreaks of illness, which can be hard to contain. Communal catteries do benefit from the fact that the animals have a much wider area to roam and play. These are usually the cheapest form of boarding cattery.

Semi-Communal Cattery

With individual cages and large play areas, semi-communal catteries are the middle ground between communal and celled catteries.  In responsible semi-communal catteries, the cats are fed in cage, the cats are separated at night from non-family members, and there is the monitoring of toileting. Specific diets can be catered for, and medications can be given. The play areas of semi-communal catteries can have meshed open-air areas which along with separate animal feeding helps to greatly reduce the transmission of illness. Although some are just large internal rooms with little ventilation which can negate some of the benefits. 

Celled Cattery 
Often purpose-built, as the name suggests these are individual cells for cats. Similar to an aviary, they are meshed rooms within a much large facility, usually with one face open to the air.  They have great ventilation, and the transmission of illness is the least of all the boarding catteries.  As with the semi-communal cattery, celled catteries can feed specialised diets and monitor toileting, and medicate where required.  There is no chance of the non-familial cats intermingling and the chance of overcrowding is greatly reduced too. The catteries charge a premium and are at the highest end of the pricing spectrum.

Breeding Cattery
A breeding cattery is a place specialized in breeding valuable pet cats for sale and profit. Unlike traditional pet shops, pet hospitals or some boarding catteries, breeding catteries do not have grooming, bathing, nursing, treatment and other associated businesses. Most breeding cattery operators use ordinary residential houses as breeding places and can be similar either to communal boarding catteries or celled boarding catteries. To purchase and sell cats, they will use speciality websites, online marketplaces or the pet trading market, in rare cases they will sell to pet shops.

Licensed breeding catteries are heavily regulated and must follow relevant government legislation. Breed club members are expected to comply with the general Code of Ethics and guidelines applicable to the breed concerned. clubs may also stipulate criteria to be met before issuing registration papers for kittens bred. A kennel name or kennel prefix is a name associated with each breeding cattery: it is the first part of the registered name of a pedigreed cat which was bred there.

In the United States the term boarding kennel can also be used to refer to boarding catteries and licensing agencies do not always differentiate between commercial boarding kennels for dogs and other animal or cat boarding catteries. In 2007 market surveys showed that $3.0 billion was spent on these services. Annual for US cat owners was $149 according to a 2007–2008 survey.

See also
Animal shelter
Pet House

References

External links 
 
 

Cats
Animal shelters
Buildings and structures used to confine animals
Felids and humans